San Fedele is a village in Tuscany, central Italy, administratively a frazione of the comune of Radda in Chianti, province of Siena.

San Fedele is about 18 km from Siena and 10 km from Radda in Chianti.

Bibliography 
 

Frazioni of Radda in Chianti